Anthony "Antz" Nansen (born 12 March 1983) is a New Zealand professional boxer, kickboxer, mixed martial artist

Career
Nansen practiced Kung Fu as a child and grew up playing rugby league. He began training in kickboxing at the age of 21. He is the cousin of Ray Sefo. He holds a professional kickboxing record of 22 wins and 3 loss, and has been the kickboxing champion of New Zealand in three different weight classes. He defeated Joel Martin in October 2008 to become the World Kickboxing Federation (WKBF) Heavyweight Kickboxing Champion of New Zealand.

On 23 September 2009, he made his mixed martial arts debut against Olympic judoka Hiroshi Izumi at World Victory Road Presents: Sengoku 10 in Saitama, Japan. Nansen was able to control the fight with his striking and won via technical knockout in the first round.

The following year, on 25 April, Nansen took part in his second MMA bout at ASTRA: Yoshida's Farewell against jiu-jitsu fighter Enson Inoue, who was making his return to the ring after six years of retirement. Inoue used his superior grappling skills to win via submission by using an armbar in round 1.

He was then set to face Satoshi Ishii, another of Japan's Olympic judoka, at the K-1 World MAX 2010. However, Nansen was unable to compete

Personal life
Nansen is a senior member of the Hells Angels.

Titles
2013 King in the Ring KickBoxing HeavyWeight 100 kg Class Champion
2011 WKBF World Heavyweight Kickboxing Champion 
2011 King in the Ring KickBoxing HeavyWeight 100 kg Class Champion
IMF Heavyweight Muay Thai Champion of New Zealand
WKBF Super Heavyweight Muay Thai Champion of New Zealand
WKBF Heavyweight Kickboxing Champion of New Zealand
WKBF Super Cruiserweight Kickboxing Champion of New Zealand

Boxing record

| style="text-align:center;" colspan="8"|4 Wins (1 knockout 2 decisions), 3 Loss, 0 Draws
|-
|align=center style="border-style: none none solid solid; background: #e3e3e3"|Res.
|align=center style="border-style: none none solid solid; background: #e3e3e3"|Record
|align=center style="border-style: none none solid solid; background: #e3e3e3"|Opponent
|align=center style="border-style: none none solid solid; background: #e3e3e3"|Type
|align=center style="border-style: none none solid solid; background: #e3e3e3"|Rd., Time
|align=center style="border-style: none none solid solid; background: #e3e3e3"|Date
|align=center style="border-style: none none solid solid; background: #e3e3e3"|Location
|align=center style="border-style: none none solid solid; background: #e3e3e3"|Notes
|- 
| style="background: Loss
| align=center|4-3
|  Michael Sprott
| align=center|UD
| align=center|3 (3)
| align=center|4 June 2014
|  Auckland, New Zealand
| Super 8 Heavyweight Tournament - Semi Final 1
|-
| style="background: Win
| align=center|4-2
|  Hasim Rahman
| align=center|UD
| align=center|3 (3)
| align=center|4 June 2014
|  Auckland, New Zealand
| Super 8 Heavyweight Tournament - Quarter Final 1
|-
| style="background: Loss
| align=center|3-2
|  Junior Maletino Iakopo
| align=center|MD
| align=center|4 (4)
| align=center|20 September 2013
|  Auckland, New Zealand
| 
|-
| style="background: Loss
| align=center|3-1
|  Seiaute Mailata
| align=center|KO
| align=center|1 (4)
| align=center|16 September 2008
|  Otara, New Zealand
| 
|-
| style="background: Win
| align=center|3-0
|  Sean Sullivan
| align=center|MD
| align=center|3, 3:00
| align=center|1 December 2007
|  Ellerslie, New Zealand
| 
|- 
| style="background: Win
| align=center|2-0
|  Shane Old
| align=center|TKO (corner stoppage)
| align=center|2 (3)
| align=center|5 May 2007
|  Ellerslie, New Zealand
| 
|-
| style="background: Win
| align=center|1-0
|  Jeff Seedy
| align=center|UD
| align=center|3, 2:00
| align=center|2 December 2006
|  Ellerslie, New Zealand
| Professional boxing debut.
|-

Kickboxing record

|-
|
|Win
| Alofa Solitua
|The King in the Ring
|Auckland, New Zealand
|TKO
|align="center"|3
|align="center"|
| 
|-
|
|Win
| Nato Laauli
|The King in the Ring 7
|Auckland, New Zealand
|Decision (unanimous)
|align="center"|3
|align="center"|3:00
|Wins King in the Ring 8-man tournament
|-
|
|Win
| Pane Haraki
|The King in the Ring 7
|Auckland, New Zealand
|Decision (unanimous)
|align="center"|3
|align="center"|3:00
|Semi Finals
|-
|
|Win
| Dan Stirling
|The King in the Ring 7
|Auckland, New Zealand
|Decision (unanimous)
|align="center"|3
|align="center"|3:00
|Quarter Finals
|-
|
|Win
| Faisal Zakaria
|The King in the Ring MAX72
|Auckland, New Zealand
|TKO (corner stoppage)
|align="center"|3
|align="center"|
| 
|-
|
|Loss
| Paul Slowinski
|Knees of Fury 39
|Adelaide, Australia
|KO (kick to the body)
|align="center"|2
|align="center"|N/A
| 
|-
|
|Win
| Erik Nosa
|King in the Ring MAX
|Auckland, New Zealand
|TKO
|align="center"|4
|align="center"|
|Wins WKBF World Heavyweight Championship.
|-
|
|Win
| Josh Heta
|King in the Ring
|Auckland, New Zealand
|Decision (unanimous)
|align="center"|3
|align="center"|3:00
|Tournament final.
|-
|
|Win
| Henry Taani
|King in the Ring
|Auckland, New Zealand
|Decision (unanimous)
|align="center"|3
|align="center"|3:00
|Tournament semi-final.
|-
|
|Win
| Junior Ioane
|King in the Ring
|Auckland, New Zealand
|TKO (corner stoppage)
|align="center"|1
|align="center"|3:00
|Tournament quarter-final.
|-
|
|Loss
| Tony Angelov
|Philip Lam Promotions
|Auckland, New Zealand
|Decision (unanimous)
|align="center"|5
|align="center"|3:00
|For WMC New Zealand Heavyweight title.
|-
|
|Loss
| Souleimane Konaté
|Philip Lam Promotions "NZ vs Australia & France"
|Auckland, New Zealand
|Decision (unanimous)
|align="center"|5
|align="center"|3:00
| 
|-
|
|Win
| Joel Martin
|New Zealand Kickboxers
|Auckland, New Zealand
|KO (knee to the body)
|align="center"|1
|align="center"|0:35
|Wins WKBF New Zealand Heavyweight title.
|-
|
|Win
| Jon Gallia
|Philip Lam Promotions
|Auckland, New Zealand
|KO (right hooks)
|align="center"|1
|align="center"|1:02
|Wins WKBF New Zealand Super Cruiserweight title.
|-
|
|Loss
| Tony Angelov
|Main Event Fights
|New Zealand
|Decision
|align="center"|3
|align="center"|3:00
|Professional kickboxing debut.
|-
|-
| colspan=9 | Legend:   
|-

Mixed martial arts record

|-
| Loss
| align=center| 1-1
| Enson Inoue
| Submission (armbar)
| Astra
| 
| align=center| 1
| align=center| 2:10
| Tokyo, Japan
| 
|-
| Win
| align=center| 1–0
| Hiroshi Izumi
| TKO (punches)
| World Victory Road Presents: Sengoku 10
| 
| align=center| 1
| align=center| 2:56
| Saitama, Saitama, Japan
|

External links

References

1983 births
Living people
Heavyweight boxers
New Zealand male kickboxers
Cruiserweight kickboxers
Heavyweight kickboxers
New Zealand male mixed martial artists
Light heavyweight mixed martial artists
Mixed martial artists utilizing boxing
Mixed martial artists utilizing Muay Thai
New Zealand Muay Thai practitioners
Sportspeople from Auckland
New Zealand Māori sportspeople
New Zealand male boxers
Boxers from Auckland
Hells Angels